Gilles Paquet-Brenner (born 14 September 1974) is a French director and screenwriter. He is the son of the opera singer Ève Brenner. Paquet-Brenner's first feature film in 2001, Pretty Things, won an award at the Deauville American Film Festival. In 2009, Paquet-Brenner directed the low-budget and direct-to-DVD but generally positively received film, Walled In.

Filmography

References

External links

1974 births
Living people
21st-century French male writers
21st-century French screenwriters
Film directors from Paris
French-language film directors
French male screenwriters
French screenwriters
Writers from Paris